London Royal is the fifth and final studio album from English singer-songwriter Get Cape. Wear Cape. Fly released on 12 September 2014 on Alcopop! Records. It was released on the same day as final the Get Cape. Wear Cape. Fly gig at The Forum, London.

Track listing

Personnel
 Get Cape. Wear Cape. Fly – guitar/vocals

References

2014 albums
Alcopop! Records albums
Get Cape. Wear Cape. Fly albums